Interleukin-1 receptor-associated kinase 3 is an enzyme that in humans is encoded by the IRAK3 gene. Using in vivo liposome-mediated delivery of CRISPR/Cas9 plasmid expressing IRAK3 gRNA, IRAK3 was shown to be responsible for endotoxin-induced expression of A20 and VE-cadherin in endothelial cells. Thus, IRAK3 is crucial for maintenance and repair of endothelial barrier after endotoxin-induced lung injury.

References

Further reading

External links 
 

EC 2.7.11